Walther-Schreiber-Platz is a Berlin U-Bahn station located on the  line in Steglitz-Zehlendorf. Built from 1967 to 1969, the station is located completely under the Bundesallee, which flows into Walther-Schreiber-Platz. The station was opened on 29 January 1971, and until September 1974 was the southern terminus of the former Line 9.

Overview
The station is located in Friedenau, close to the borders with Steglitz. The Schloss-Straßen-Center (SSC) and the Forum Steglitz are located in the immediate vicinity.

References

External links 
 

U9 (Berlin U-Bahn) stations
Buildings and structures in Tempelhof-Schöneberg
Railway stations in Germany opened in 1971